Carandiru Penitentiary, officially São Paulo House of Detention (Portuguese: Casa de Detenção de São Paulo) was a prison located in São Paulo, Brazil. The prison was designed and built by Samuel das Neves in 1920, when it was considered a model-prison to meet the new demands of the 1890 criminal code. It was operational from 1956 to 2002 and, at its peak, was South America's largest penitentiary, housing over 8,000 inmates. In 1992 it was the site of the Carandiru massacre. It was demolished in 2002.

Drauzio Varella, a noted Brazilian physician, volunteered as an unpaid physician in Carandiru from 1989 to 2001, in particular to address its AIDS epidemic.  He wrote a book, Estação Carandiru, describing his own experiences there and the dreadful conditions of the inmates. The book was later made into a movie (Carandiru, directed by Hector Babenco), and both were highly regarded by critics and the public.

The prison was demolished on December 8, 2002. One block was left intact to be used as a museum, now open to public and accessible via Carandiru Metro Station (Estação Carandiru). Today the Parque da Juventude complex is located on the site of the former penitentiary.

Cultural references 
The Carandiru Penitentiary is the inspiration for the Penitenciaría Federal de Sona; the prison the fictional TV character, Michael Scofield, was incarcerated in during the third season of the US television series Prison Break.

Jorge Aragão refers to Carandiru in his song "O Iraque é Aqui".

Brazilian metal band Sepultura wrote the song "Manifest" about the massacre. The track is featured on their 1993 album Chaos A.D..

Brazilian rap band Racionais Mc's wrote the song "Diário De Um Detento" and refers to Carandiru.

References